The Gibson Girl was the personification of the feminine ideal of physical attractiveness as portrayed by the pen-and-ink illustrations of artist Charles Dana Gibson during a 20-year period that spanned the late 19th and early 20th centuries in the United States. The artist saw his creation as representing the composite of "thousands of American girls".

Image

The Gibson Girl image that appeared in the 1890s combined elements of older American images of contemporary female beauty, such as the "fragile lady" and the "voluptuous woman". From the "fragile lady" she took the basic slender lines, and a sense of respectability. From the "voluptuous woman" she took a large bust and hips, but was not vulgar or lewd, as previous images of women with large busts and hips had been depicted. From this combination emerged the Gibson Girl, who was tall and slender, yet with ample bosom, hips and buttocks. She had an exaggerated S-curve torso shape achieved by wearing a swan-bill corset. Images of her epitomized the late 19th- and early 20th-century Western preoccupation with youthful features and ephemeral beauty. Her neck was thin and her hair piled high upon her head in the contemporary bouffant, pompadour, and chignon ("waterfall of curls") fashions. The statuesque, narrow-waisted ideal feminine figure was portrayed as being at ease and stylish.

She was a member of upper middle class society, always perfectly dressed in the latest fashionable attire appropriate for the place and time of day. The Gibson Girl was also one of the new, more athletic-shaped women, who could be found cycling through Central Park, often exercised and was emancipated to the extent that she could enter the workplace. In addition to the Gibson Girl's refined beauty, in spirit, she was calm, independent, confident, and sought personal fulfillment. She could be depicted attending college and vying for a good mate, but she would never have participated in the suffrage movement.

Taking part in the suffrage movement was something more associated with the New Woman, another cultural image of women that emerged around the same time as the Gibson Girl. As a more popular version of the New Woman, the Gibson Girl both undermined and sanctioned women's desires for progressive sociopolitical change. The New Woman was the more disconcerting of the two images at the time as she was seen as an example of change and disruption within the old patterns of social order, asking for the right to equal educational and work opportunities as well as progressive reform, sexual freedom and suffrage. Whilst the Gibson Girl took on many characteristics of the New Woman, she did so without involving herself in politics and thus did not appear to contemporaries at the time to be usurping traditionally masculine roles as the New Woman was deemed to. She therefore managed to stay within the boundaries of feminine roles without too much transgression.

Gibson depicted her as an equal and sometimes teasing companion to men. She was also sexually dominant, for example, literally examining comical little men under a magnifying glass, or, in a breezy manner, crushing them under her feet. Next to the beauty of a Gibson Girl, men often appeared as simpletons or bumblers; and even men with handsome physiques or great wealth alone could not provide satisfaction to her. Gibson illustrated men so captivated by her looks that they would follow her anywhere, attempting to fulfill any desire, even if it was absurd. One memorable drawing shows dumbstruck men following a Gibson Girl's command to plant a young, leafless tree upside-down, roots in the air, simply because she wanted it that way. Most often, a Gibson Girl appeared single and uncommitted. However, a romance always relieved her boredom. Once married, she was shown deeply frustrated if romantic love had disappeared from her life, but satisfied if socializing with girlfriends or happy when doting on her infant child. In drawings such as these there was no hint at pushing the boundaries of women's roles; instead they often cemented the long-standing beliefs held by many from the old social orders, rarely depicting the Gibson Girl as taking part in any activity that could be seen as out of the ordinary for a woman.

The artist believed that the Gibson Girl represented the beauty of American women:

Gibson believed that America's women would become more beautiful:

Many women posed for Gibson Girl-style illustrations, including Gibson's wife, Irene Langhorne, who may have been the original model, and was a sister of Viscountess Nancy (Langhorne) Astor. Other models included Mabel Normand, Evelyn Nesbit, Minnie Clark, and Clara B. Fayette. The most famous Gibson Girl was probably the American-British stage actress, Camille Clifford, whose high coiffure and long, elegant gowns that wrapped around her hourglass figure and tightly corseted wasp waist defined the style. 

Among the many "Gibson Girl" illustrators were Howard Chandler Christy whose work celebrating American "beauties" was similar to Gibson's, and Harry G. Peter, who was most famous for his art on Wonder Woman comics.

In the newly developing art of cinema, although most leading actresses were at the cutting style of the day, the ones who came to embody it best were the Biograph girls, Florence Lawrence and to a more ingénue side of it, Mary Pickford. They personified and catapulted the cult of the ideal woman for the masses beyond American borders. Camille Clifford, a woman known as the "ideal Gibson Girl", posed for various photographers and produced photographs that exemplified the physical characteristics of the Gibson Girl.

Popularity
Some people argue that the Gibson Girl was the first national beauty standard for American women. Gibson's fictional images of her published in newspapers and magazines during the Belle Époque were extremely popular. Merchandise bearing her image included saucers, ashtrays, tablecloths, pillow covers, chair covers, souvenir spoons, screens, fans, and umbrella stands.

By the outbreak of World War I, changing fashions caused the Gibson Girl to fall out of favor as women favored practical clothing compatible with changing times over the elegant dresses, bustle gowns, shirtwaists, and terraced, floor-length skirts favored by the Gibson Girl. The image was not forgotten, however, with the USAAF World War II-era SCR-578, and the similar post-war AN/CRT-3, survival radio transmitters carried by aircraft on over-water operations being given the nickname "Gibson Girl" because of their "hourglass" shape, which allowed them to be held stationary between the legs while the generator handle was turned.

See also
 It girl
 Corset controversy
 Flapper
 John Held, Jr.
 Nell Brinkley
 Pompadour haircut
 Evelyn Nesbit

References

Further reading

External links

 

American culture
1890s fashion
1900s fashion
Corsetry
Fashion aesthetics
Victorian era
Stereotypes of women
Belle Époque